Fiddle Dancer Boy (1978–1991) was a Canadian Thoroughbred racehorse who won the 1981 Queen's Plate, Canada's most prestigious race and North America's oldest annually run stakes race. Bred by prominent Ontario owner/breeder Warren Beasley, he was sired by Nice Dancer, the 1972 Canadian Champion Three-Year-Old Male Horse. He was out of the mare Fiddly Dee, whose sire was 1961 Canadian Horse of the Year Hidden Treasure.

As a yearling, Fiddle Dancer Boy was purchased for $20,000 by Toronto car dealer Jack Carmichael and his brother Donald on the recommendation of future Hall of Fame trainer Jim Bentley.

1981 Queen's Plate
Sent off by the betting public at 8-to-1 odds in the Queen's Plate, Fiddle Dancer Boy defeated the heavily favored Frost King to win the race. The horse's success led to owner Jack Carmichael eventually buying the Huntington Stud Farm in Kleinburg, Ontario following the retirement of owner Bill Sills.

Although Fiddle Dancer Boy suffered from foot ailments, he raced successfully for another two years,  retiring at age five to stand at stud. From a limited number of offspring, he notably sired Complete Endeavor, who won fourteen career races including five in a row in 1990.

Fiddle Dancer Boy died of colic at age thirteen on November 11, 1991.

Pedigree

References

 Fiddle Dancer Boy's pedigree and partial racing stats
 July 5, 1981 New York Times article titled Fiddle Dancer Boy Wins Queen's Plate

1978 racehorse births
1991 racehorse deaths
Racehorses bred in Ontario
Racehorses trained in Canada
King's Plate winners
Thoroughbred family 14-f